Archon (Gr. αρχων, pl. αρχοντες) is a Greek word that means "ruler".

Archon may also refer to:

Butterflies and moths
 Archon (butterfly), a genus of butterflies
 Paysandisia archon, a moth

Entertainment
 Archon (convention), a science fiction/gaming convention held in Collinsville, Illinois
 Archon (Dungeons & Dragons), a fantasy race featured in the Dungeons & Dragons role-playing game
 Archon: The Light and the Dark, a video game from 1983
Archon II: Adept, a video game from 1984
 Archons, the crew of the U.S.S. Archon in the original Star Trek episode "The Return of the Archons"
 The Archon, the second book of the Oracle Prophecies Trilogy by Catherine Fisher
 Archon, an Angelic Battle-Priest from the video game Darksiders II
 Archon, a character from the video game Mass Effect: Andromeda
 Archon, a playable character from the mobile game Crusaders Quest
In the video game Genshin Impact, "archon" refers to the head god or divine ruler of each of the seven countries in the world of Teyvat

People
 Archon of Pella, a satrap of Babylonia and one of the Diadochi
 Archon of Aegeira, an Achaean statesman in the 2nd century BCE

Other uses
 Archon, Aisne, a commune in northern France
 Archon (Gnosticism), a kind of supernatural being who stood between the human race and a transcendent God
 Archon (software), open source archival information system
 Archon Corporation, a company that has owned casinos and water parks
 Archon X Prize, a genomics contest
 ARCHON Directory, a computer directory in the UK's National Archives
 Archon, an object classification in the SCP Foundation storytelling project

See also
 Archons of the Ecumenical Patriarchate, an award of merit bestowed by the Patriarch of Constantinople
 Archaeon, a domain of single-celled microorganisms
 Archonta, a (possibly obsolete) category of mammals including primates and bats